Leon Ivor Mendonca (13 July 1934 – 14 June 2014) was a West Indian cricketer who played in two Test matches in 1962.

Career
A wicket-keeper and useful batsman, he played for British Guiana from 1958–59 to 1961–62. On his first-class debut against Barbados he opened the batting and scored 74 and 27, and in his second match, also against Barbados, he made 5 and 69. He later batted down the order.

He made his Test debut against India in the Second Test at Kingston in 1961–62, when batting at number eight he made 78, his highest first-class score, adding 127 for the seventh wicket with Gary Sobers and 74 for the eighth wicket with Charlie Stayers.

He lost his place to David Allan for the Third Test, returned for the Fourth, then was replaced by Allan again for the Fifth. The Fourth Test was his last first-class match.

Personal life
Mendonca was born in Bartica, British Guiana. His parents were Ineas Mendonca and Osmond Mendonca. Ivor Mendonca was the oldest of 10 brothers and sisters. He suffered cancer of the larynx and prostate and died in 2014.

He was the uncle of English footballer Clive Mendonca.

References

External links

1934 births
2014 deaths
Guyanese cricketers
West Indies Test cricketers
Guyana cricketers
Guyanese people of Portuguese descent
People from Cuyuni-Mazaruni
Deaths from laryngeal cancer
Deaths from prostate cancer
Wicket-keepers